Charles Crump may refer to:

Charles Crump (footballer) (1840–1923), English footballer, football administrator and referee
Charles Crump (cricketer) (1837–1912), New Zealand cricketer